Nizhnenovokutlumbetyevo is a rural locality (a (village)  in Matveyevsky District of Orenburg Oblast, Russia. Population:

References

Rural localities in Orenburg Oblast